Howell Township may refer to:

 Howell Township, Johnson County, Arkansas, in Johnson County, Arkansas
 Howell Township, Michigan
 Howell Township, Howell County, Missouri
 Howell Township, New Jersey
 Howell Township, Towner County, North Dakota, in Towner County, North Dakota

Township name disambiguation pages